The 2011 season is Bolívar's  35th competitive season in the Liga de Fútbol Profesional Boliviano, and 87th year in existence as a football club. To see more news about Bolivar see Bolivar Official Website

Transfers

In

Out

First Team Squad
The squad will be announced on January 13

Coaching staff

Competitions

Copa Libertadores

Squad

First stage

Torneo Clausura

Squad

Results summary

Results by round

Matches

Standings

Statistics
Includes all competitive matches.

Club Bolívar seasons
Club Bolívar

es:Club Bolivar